Eiland is a surname. Notable people with the surname include:

Craig Eiland (born 1962), Democrat and Speaker pro Tempore of the Texas House of Representatives
Dave Eiland (born 1966), pitcher in Major League Baseball
Deandre' Eiland (born 1982), American football player
Giora Eiland (born 1952), Major General (ret.), Israel Defense Forces

See also
De Laatste Dagen van een Eiland, 1942 Dutch film directed by Ernst Winar
Driekops Eiland, rock engraving or petroglyph site in the bed of the Riet River near Plooysburg, near Kimberley, Northern Cape, South Africa
Beck v. Eiland-Hall concerns the spoof website entitled DidGlennBeckRapeAndMurderAYoungGirlIn1990
Stoelmans Eiland Airstrip (IATA: SMZ, ICAO: SMST), near Stoelmans Eiland, Suriname